The sooty thicket fantail (Rhipidura threnothorax) is a species of bird in the family Rhipiduridae. It is found in New Guinea.

Habitats and behavior 
The majority of fantails are strong fliers, and some species can undertake long migrations, but sooty thicket fantail as well as the other thicket fantails (white-bellied thicket fantail and black thicket fantail) are very weak fliers, and need to alight regularly.

Its natural habitat is subtropical or tropical moist lowland forests.

Taxonomy 
According to IOC there are 2  recognised subspecies. In alphabetical order, these are:

 R. t. fumosa	Schlegel, 1871 — Yapen (Geelvink Bay, NW of New Guinea)
 R. t. threnothorax	Müller, S, 1843 — Raja Ampat Islands (NW of New Guinea), Aru Islands (SW of New Guinea) and New Guinea

References

External Links 
 Sooty thicket fantail Rhipidura threnothorax Müller, S, 1843 «xeno-canto» website — Birds' Voices all over the world
 
 

sooty thicket fantail
Birds of New Guinea
sooty thicket fantail
Taxonomy articles created by Polbot